Stenoma funerana is a moth in the family Depressariidae. It was described by Jan Sepp in 1847. It is found in the Guianas.

References

Moths described in 1847
Stenoma